Setup is a direct-to-video action thriller heist film directed by Mike Gunther and written by Gunther and Mike Behrman. It stars Curtis "50 Cent" Jackson, Bruce Willis and Ryan Phillippe.

It was released straight to DVD and Blu-ray on September 20, 2011 in the United States.

Plot
In Detroit three friends, Sonny (50 Cent), Dave (Brett Granstaff) and Vincent (Ryan Phillippe), plan out a detailed heist of $5 million dollars worth of diamonds. Their plans turn deadly when Vincent betrays the others, shooting Sonny and Dave (who dies on the spot). Sonny manages to survive and seeks revenge by teaming up with the most dangerous mob boss in town (Bruce Willis) to retrieve the money from the heist.

Biggs, the mob boss sends Petey (one of his henchmen) and Sonny to retrieve $2 million buried in a cemetery. They get the money and Petey puts the money in the trunk of his car. But Petey accidentally shoots himself. Sonny brings Petey's body to the Butcher. He follows Mia to the fence's home and threatens him. The fence runs to Vincent saying that he has to clean up his mess because he left Sonny alive as a loose end. Vincent kills him.

Biggs inquires about Petey and Sonny. Sal interrogates Ivan to death trying to find out information on Petey. Sonny heads to the church where the pastor asks, "do you believe in free will? the idea that you are free to make your own choices in this world?". Sonny replies "of course", the pastor continues, "then how could you make a choice between right and wrong if god did not offer the two extremes?". Vincent seeks John's help to close on the Sonny loose end. Sonny visits the cemetery and Dave's grave.

Sonny visits the Prison where Vincent's father is and he asks if there is anything you want me to ask your son before I kill him? Mia is attacked in her home by the owner of the diamonds demanding his diamonds back. Vincent visits Mia and finds her dead body.

Sal and Tony interrogate another Russian who says "the black man took the money that's all I see, he took it." After the Russian dies in interrogation, Biggs says "I think he was telling the truth".

Vincent meets with Saunders in the prison, who extorts him for $100,000 in protection money to protect his father. Vincent visits his father who divulges that he knows that Sonny is alive and he visited him. He tells his son "Big men make big moves, are you a big man?".

Sonny takes some of Biggs' $2 million and puts it into a Teddy Bear and then into a Box. Then, Sonny goes to Biggs and falsely claims that Vincent has his money. John arranges a meeting with Vincent and Biggs. Biggs demands his money; and there is a shootout with many casualties. Sonny chases Vincent but is eluded by him. The owner of the diamonds breaks into Vincent's home and confronts him as he is packing away his money, but he kills him. Sonny ambushes Vincent just as he is about to open his car door. Sonny dowses him in oil and asks Vincent to dig his own grave. Vincent confesses that he was forced to kill Sonny and Dave because Saunders had threatened to kill his father; and that he needed all of the money to get out of trouble. Sonny spares his life. In the next scene, pans to the prison where Vincent's father is and he is murdered by another inmate. Dave's girlfriend receives the package with the Teddy bear with the money put there by Sonny. Sonny takes the money from the locker and quips "An eye for an eye leaves everyone blind. As i was not my brother's keeper, neither was I his killer. I could live with the fact that Vincent was still alive. Question was, could he?" Sonny drives off - cut to credits.

Cast
50 Cent as Sonny
Bruce Willis as Biggs
Ryan Phillippe as Vincent
Jenna Dewan as Mia
Randy Couture as Petey
James Remar as William
Brett Granstaff as Dave
Will Yun Lee as Joey
Shaun Toub as Roth
Susie Abromeit as Valerie
Rory Markham as Markus
Jay Karnes as Russell
Ambyr Childers as Waitress Haley
Omar Dorsey as G Money
Richard Goteri as John R
Michael Mili as Gangster 1

Production
Filming began in November 2010 in Grand Rapids, Michigan. Set Up is the first film in a $200 million deal with the production companies Cheetah Vision and George Furla's Hedge Fund Film Partners. Grindstone Entertainment Group and Lionsgate distributed the film in the United States and Canada. 20th Century Fox under the Chernin Entertainment label distributed the film internationally.

Box office
As of November 11, 2022, Setup grossed $2,140,476 in the United Arab Emirates, Russia, Spain, Portugal, Hungary, and Lebanon.

References

External links

 
 

2011 films
2011 direct-to-video films
2011 action thriller films
2011 crime thriller films
2011 independent films
2010s heist films
American action thriller films
American crime thriller films
American direct-to-video films
American heist films
MoviePass Films films
American films about revenge
Films shot in Michigan
2010s English-language films
2010s American films